Rémy Rebeyrotte (born 27 March 1966) is a French politician who has been serving as the member of the National Assembly for the 3rd constituency of Saône-et-Loire since 2017. A member of La République En Marche! (LREM), which he joined after leaving the Socialist Party (PS), he became Mayor of Autun following the 2001 municipal election. He resigned the mayorship after the 2017 legislative election.

Political career
Rebeyrotte was a member of the Socialist Party (PS) until 2012.

In Parliament, Rebeyrotte serves on the Committee on Legal Affairs. In addition to his committee assignments, he is part of the French Parliamentary Friendship Group with Burkina Faso.

When Richard Ferrand was elected President of the National Assembly, Rebeyrotte stood as a candidate to succeed him as president of the LREM parliamentary group. In an internal vote, he came in last out of seven; the position went to Gilles Le Gendre instead.

On July 12, 2022, to criticize a far-right opponent, Rebeyrotte made the Nazi gesture in the hemicycle of the French National Assembly. He received only a simple call to order as a sanction on July 25. The National Rally pary of Marine Le Pen then filed a complaint following these events against Rebeyrotte.

Political positions
Rebeyrotte was one of 36 LREM members who voted against a ban of glyphosate.

See also
 2017 French legislative election

References

1966 births
Living people
People from Autun
Politicians from Bourgogne-Franche-Comté
Socialist Party (France) politicians
La République En Marche! politicians
Territories of Progress politicians
Deputies of the 15th National Assembly of the French Fifth Republic
Deputies of the 16th National Assembly of the French Fifth Republic
Mayors of places in Bourgogne-Franche-Comté